William Henry McNeely is an American former Negro league outfielder who played in the 1940s.

McNeely served in the US Marines during World War II, and played for the Birmingham Black Barons in 1946.

References

External links
 and Seamheads

Date of birth missing
Place of birth missing
Birmingham Black Barons players
Baseball outfielders
United States Marine Corps personnel of World War II
African Americans in World War II
African-American United States Navy personnel